Danny Winkler (born 16 August 1973) is a retired German football forward.

References

External links
 

1973 births
Living people
German footballers
Bundesliga players
SV Waldhof Mannheim players
VfL Bochum players
Stuttgarter Kickers players
SV Eintracht Trier 05 players
TSG 1899 Hoffenheim players
Place of birth missing (living people)
Association football forwards